Janówek may refer to:

Janówek, Jelenia Góra County in Lower Silesian Voivodeship (south-west Poland)
Janówek, Wrocław County in Lower Silesian Voivodeship (south-west Poland)
Janówek, Podlaskie Voivodeship (north-east Poland)
Janówek, Bełchatów County in Łódź Voivodeship (central Poland)
Janówek, Łęczyca County in Łódź Voivodeship (central Poland)
Janówek, Gmina Mełgiew in Lublin Voivodeship (east Poland)
Janówek, Gmina Piaski in Lublin Voivodeship (east Poland)
Janówek, Garwolin County in Masovian Voivodeship (east-central Poland)
Janówek, Gostynin County in Masovian Voivodeship (east-central Poland)
Janówek, Grójec County in Masovian Voivodeship (east-central Poland)
Janówek, Piaseczno County in Masovian Voivodeship (east-central Poland)
Janówek, Sochaczew County in Masovian Voivodeship (east-central Poland)
Janówek, Węgrów County in Masovian Voivodeship (east-central Poland)
Janówek, Gmina Mszczonów in Masovian Voivodeship (east-central Poland)
Janówek, Gmina Wiskitki in Masovian Voivodeship (east-central Poland)
Janówek, Nowy Dwór Mazowiecki County in Masovian Voivodeship (east-central Poland)
Janówek, Warmian-Masurian Voivodeship (north Poland)